Unleashed is a 2005 action thriller film directed by Louis Leterrier, written by Luc Besson, and co-produced by Jet Li and Besson. It stars Jet Li, Morgan Freeman, Bob Hoskins and Kerry Condon, with action choreography by Yuen Woo-Ping. The film's setting and shooting location are Glasgow.

Plot
Bart, a vicious loan shark residing in Glasgow, uses his bodyguard, Danny, to violently attack non-complying customers. Bart has raised and trained Danny to be an attack dog and uses a metal collar around Danny's neck to control him; once the collar is off, Danny becomes a skilled fighter who relentlessly attacks his target. Once on, however, the collar turns Danny docile and harmless, with him developing very little knowledge on how to act as a socialized person.

As the collar trick with Danny starts to fail due to its inherent limitations, a crime boss approaches Bart with a business deal, offering Bart a hefty money prize in exchange for Danny winning, and surviving, death matches held in an underground fighting ring. After Danny easily wins the first fight, however, Bart gets into a mishap with another mobster and is left for dead after a shooting. Danny survives and takes refuge in an antiques warehouse, where he passes out due to his injuries. Sam, a blind piano tuner, takes him to his home. Together with his stepdaughter Victoria, Sam treats Danny's wounds and warmly welcomes him to their family. Danny slowly learns to be a civilized man and abandons his violent nature, especially after Victoria removes his collar. He also curiously develops an interest in music and begins using scattered memories to try and remember his past, particularly his mother.

Weeks later, Sam informs Danny about moving back to New York, where he and Victoria are originally from. He invites Danny, telling him they think of him as family, and Danny happily accepts. However, while out shopping alone, Danny runs into Bart's right-hand man Lefty, who reveals Bart is still alive. Lefty brings him back to Bart's compound, where Danny asks Bart if he knew Danny's mother. Bart denies knowing her and snaps a new collar back on Danny before taking him to the fighting ring. Danny refuses to fight, insisting he doesn't want to hurt people anymore, forcing a livid Bart to shove him into the pit. Danny initially struggles to defend himself against his four opponents but eventually defeats them all to save his own life; however, he refuses to kill them, much to Bart's chagrin. Bart drags Danny back to their compound and throws him into his cell. However, Danny sneaks out and looks through Bart's old photographs, finding one of a person who looks like Danny's mother. Danny angrily confronts Bart to demand answers, but Bart simply responds that his mother was a prostitute who is long gone.

Danny manages to escape from Bart the next morning and goes back to Sam and Victoria, telling them where he was and what he has learned. With the two's help, Danny regains memories from his childhood past: his mother was a music student who offered herself to Bart to get money to pay for her lessons while hiding Danny from him at the time. It ended when Bart shot her to death when she finally defied him, and Bart has raised Danny ever since.

Bart and a group of thugs arrive at Sam's apartment building to capture Danny. Danny hides Sam and Victoria in their closet and goes out to fight them off. Danny proceeds to confront and furiously beat Bart, causing Sam and Victoria to burst out and beg Danny not to kill; however, a defeated Bart orders Danny otherwise. Bart tells Danny he will always be an animal, to which Sam responds by smashing a flowerpot on Bart's head, knocking him unconscious. Sam, Danny, and Victoria embrace.

Sometime later, Danny is with Sam at a piano recital at Carnegie Hall, where Victoria is getting ready to perform. Realizing Victoria is playing what his mother played years ago, Danny sheds a happy tear.

Cast
 Jet Li as Danny a.k.a. Danny the Dog
 Morgan Freeman as Sam
 Bob Hoskins as Bart
 Kerry Condon as Victoria
 Vincent Regan as Raffles
 Dylan Brown as Lefty
 Tamer Hassan as Georgie
 Michael Jenn as Wyeth
 Jean-François Lénogue as Raffles thug
 Scott Adkins as Swimming pool fighter
 Silvio Simac (uncredited) as Swimming pool fighter
 Mike Ian Lambert as The Stranger
Kazu Patrick Tang as Bart's Thug

Release
Unleashed was first distributed in France as Danny the Dog on February 2, 2005.

Critical reception
Unleashed received generally positive reviews. The film has a rating of 66% on Rotten Tomatoes based on 131 reviews with an average score of 6.2/10. The critical consensus states: "Jet Li gets to emote in some emotionally awkward scenes, but the gritty fight sequences come through in what is Li's best English language film." The film also has a score of 58 out of 100 on Metacritic based on 31 reviews.

Roger Ebert of the Chicago Sun Times gave the film 3 out of 4 stars, stating "The film is ingenious in its construction. It has all the martial arts action any Jet Li fan could possibly desire." In 2014, Time Out polled several film critics, directors, actors and stunt actors to list their top action films, and Unleashed was listed at 68th place on this list.

Box office
In North America, Unleashed was released by Rogue Pictures (which was a division of Focus Features). In its opening weekend in North America, the film grossed $10,900,901 which placed it third. It showed on 1,957 theaters for an average $5,570 per screen. The film grossed $24.5 million in North America and a further $26.3 million worldwide for a total of 50.9 million. This box office result surpassed Rogue's expectations of $18 million gross at the North America box office.

Soundtrack

The soundtrack was created by Massive Attack. It was released under the name Danny the Dog, in 2004 from Virgin/EMI Records. In 2005, Virgin Records re-released the soundtrack under the title Unleashed, with two bonus tracks produced by the RZA. Neither version features the song "Aftersun", featuring vocals by Dot Allison, that appears in the end credits of the film. The classical piano solo played in several scenes of the film is Mozart's Piano Sonata No.11 "Andante grazioso" while the song "Two Rocks and a Cup of Water" was played in one of the trailers to I Am Legend.

 "Opening Title" – 1:10
 "Atta' Boy" – 1:29
 "P Is for Piano" – 1:57
 "Simple Rules" – 1:20
 "Polaroid Girl" – 2:59
 "Sam" – 3:08
 "One Thought at a Time" – 4:23
 "Confused Images" – 1:59
 "Red Light Means Go" – 2:04
 "Collar Stays On" – 1:51
 "You've Never Had a Dream" – 2:46
 "Right Way to Hold a Spoon" – 3:19
 "Everybody's Got a Family" – 1:29
 "Two Rocks and a Cup of Water" – 2:32
 "Sweet Is Good" – 1:33
 "Montage" – 1:54
 "Everything About You Is New" – 2:25
 "The Dog Obeys" – 2:19
 "Danny the Dog" – 5:53
 "I Am Home" – 4:14
 "The Academy" – 1:45

Bonus tracks
In 2005 Virgin released a new version of the album with two bonus tracks.
 "Baby Boy" – 3:28 (Thea Van Seijen)
 "Unleash Me" – 2:36 (The RZA feat. Prodigal Sunn & Christbearer of Northstar)

References

External links
 
 
 
 

2005 films
2005 action thriller films

2005 martial arts films
American action thriller films
French action thriller films
British action thriller films
British martial arts films
English-language French films
Films directed by Louis Leterrier
Films set in Glasgow
American martial arts films 
Underground fighting films
Albums produced by Neil Davidge
Albums produced by RZA
Rogue (company) films
EuropaCorp films
Films produced by Luc Besson
Massive Attack albums
Films set in New York City
Films set in a movie theatre
2000s American films
2000s British films
2000s French films